Riyazul Huda is a Bangladeshi cricketer. He made his List A debut for Kala Bagan Krira Chakra in the 2017–18 Dhaka Premier Division Cricket League on 16 March 2018.

References

External links
 

Date of birth missing (living people)
Living people
Bangladeshi cricketers
Kala Bagan Krira Chakra cricketers
Place of birth missing (living people)
Year of birth missing (living people)